The 1936–38 Central European International Cup was the fourth edition of the Central European International Cup played between 1936 and 1938. It was played in a round robin tournament between five teams involved in the tournament. This edition of the tournament was interrupted due to the annexation of Austria to Nazi Germany on 12 March 1938.

Final standings

Matches

Not played
Hungary – Italy
Italy – Czechoslovakia 
Italy – Austria

Winner
No Winner of 1936–38 Central European International Cup

Statistics

Goalscorers

See also
Balkan CupBaltic CupNordic CupMediterranean Cup

References

External links

Central European International Cup